S47 may refer to:
 S47 (Berlin), a line of the Berlin S-Bahn
 S47 (Long Island bus)
 , a submarine of the Indian Navy 
 S47: Keep at temperature not exceeding ... °C (to be specified by the manufacturer), a safety phrase
 SABCA S.47, a Belgian fighter-bomber
 Sulfur-47, an isotope of sulfur
 , a submarine of the United States Navy